Saint Pierre Yameogo (15 May 1955  – 1 April 2019) was a Burkinabé film director and screenwriter. He directed six films since 1987. His film Delwende was screened in the Un Certain Regard section at the 2005 Cannes Film Festival where it won the Prize of Hope award.

Filmography
 L'Œuf silhouette (1984)
 Dunia (1987)
 Laafi - Tout va bien (1991)
 Wendemi, l'enfant du bon Dieu (1993)
 Silmandé - Tourbillon (1998)
 Moi et mon blanc (2003)
 Delwende (2005)
 Réfugiés…. mais humains (2007)
 Bayiri, la patrie (2011)

References

External links

1955 births
2019 deaths
Burkinabé film directors
Burkinabé screenwriters
Burkinabé film producers
21st-century Burkinabé people